Gustavo Pedro Echaniz (born 11 November 1955) is a former Argentine football player who played for numerous clubs in Argentina and in Mexico.

Career
Echaniz played in the Primera División Argentina with Huracán, San Lorenzo and Unión de Santa Fe. He also played in the Argentine 2nd division with Chacarita Juniors, Lanús, Unión de Santa Fe, Chaco For Ever, Colón de Santa Fe and Almirante Brown.

He played overseas with Club América, Puebla FC and Cobras of Mexico and with St. Pölten of Austria.

After he retired from playing, Echaniz became a football coach. He managed Jorge Newbery de Comodoro Rivadavia and Tiro Federal before being appointed manager of Torneo Argentino B side Alvear Foot-Ball Club in September 2012.

References

External links
  BDFA profile

1955 births
Living people
People from San Nicolás de los Arroyos
Argentine footballers
Liga MX players
Club Atlético Huracán footballers
Unión de Santa Fe footballers
Club Atlético Lanús footballers
Chacarita Juniors footballers
Club Atlético Colón footballers
Club América footballers
Club Puebla players
Querétaro F.C. footballers
Argentine expatriate footballers
Expatriate footballers in Mexico
Expatriate footballers in Austria
Association football forwards
Sportspeople from Buenos Aires Province